This is a list of television serial dramas released by TVB in 2019, including highest-rated television dramas and award ceremonies.

Top ten drama series in ratings
The following is a list of TVB's top serial dramas in 2019 by viewership ratings. The recorded ratings include premiere week, final week, finale episode, and the average overall count of live Hong Kong viewers (in millions).

Awards

First line-up
These dramas air in Hong Kong from 8:00pm to 8:30pm, Monday to Friday on Jade.

Second line-up
These dramas air in Hong Kong from 8:30pm to 9:30pm, Monday to Friday on Jade.

Remark: Starting on 19 Jan 2019 from 8:30 p.m to 10:30 p.m, with two back-to-back episode until 30 Mar 2019 only on Jade.

Third line-up
These dramas air in Hong Kong from 9:30pm to 10:30pm, Monday to Friday on Jade.

Weekend dramas
These dramas air in Hong Kong from 8:30pm to 10:30pm, with two back-to-back episodes Sunday on Jade.

Starting on 6 April 2019 until 4 May 2019 from 9:30pm to 10:30pm, Saturday on Jade.

Starting on 01 Jun 2019 until 27 July 2019 from 8:30pm to 10:30pm, with two back-to-back episodes Saturday on Jade

Starting on 03 Aug 2019 has rescheduled from 11:50pm to 2:05am with two back-to-back episodes Saturday and Sunday on Jade

References

External links
TVB.com Official Website 

2019
2019 in Hong Kong television